Wake Up and Smell the Coffee is a 2001 screen adaptation of Eric Bogosian's one man show of the same name. It was directed by Michael Rauch.

References

External links

2001 films
2001 comedy films
American films based on plays
2000s English-language films
American comedy films